Moussa N'Daw (born on 15 July 1968) is a Senegalese former professional footballer who played as a striker. He made his career in the Moroccan league, in Wydad Casablanca during 1991 to 1992 and in the Saudi Professional League during 1992 to 1994 with Al-Hilal and 1999 to 2000 with Al-Ittifaq. He is now a coach in Senegal with Jeanne d'Arc in Dakar.

References

1968 births
Living people
Sportspeople from Thiès
Senegalese footballers
Association football forwards
Senegal international footballers
Botola players
Saudi Professional League players
Ligue 2 players
Al Hilal SFC players
ASC Jeanne d'Arc players
Wydad AC players
S.C. Farense players
Al-Riyadh SC players
1990 African Cup of Nations players
1992 African Cup of Nations players
Expatriate footballers in Morocco
Senegalese expatriate sportspeople in Morocco
Expatriate footballers in Saudi Arabia
Senegalese expatriate sportspeople in Saudi Arabia
Expatriate footballers in France
Senegalese expatriate sportspeople in France
Expatriate footballers in Portugal
Senegalese expatriate sportspeople in Portugal
Senegalese football managers